Lufthansa Flight 181 was a Boeing 737-230C jetliner (reg. D-ABCE) named the Landshut that was hijacked on the afternoon of 13 October 1977 by four members of the Popular Front for the Liberation of Palestine, who called themselves Commando Martyr Halima. The objective of the hijacking was to secure the release of imprisoned Red Army Faction leaders in German prisons. In the early hours of 18 October, just after midnight, the West German counter-terrorism group GSG 9, backed by the Somali Armed Forces, stormed the aircraft in Mogadishu, Somalia, with 86 passengers and four of the total five crew rescued. The rescue operation was codenamed Feuerzauber (German for "Fire Magic"). The hijacking is considered to be part of the German Autumn.

Lufthansa crew 
Two flight crew and three cabin crew operated the round-trip flight from Frankfurt to Palma de Mallorca:

  (37)
 Captain. Born in Colditz in 1940, a former Luftwaffe Lockheed F-104 Starfighter pilot. On 16 October at Aden Airport, after being permitted to leave the aircraft to check the plane's airworthiness, he went to talk to the Yemeni airport authorities. He subsequently boarded the plane after returning and was then murdered by terrorist leader Akache. Posthumously awarded the German Federal Cross of Merit 1st class, he was survived by his wife and two sons. The building housing the Lufthansa Pilot School in Bremen was named in his honour, as was a street in the Bavarian city of Landshut. He is buried in Babenhausen in Hesse.
 Jürgen Vietor (35)
 Co-Pilot. Born in Kassel in 1942, a former German Navy pilot. He piloted the Landshut from Aden to Mogadishu. He returned to work just six weeks after the hijacking, and the first aircraft he was assigned to was the Landshut which had already been repaired and returned to service. He retired in 1999. He was also awarded the German Federal Cross of Merit 1st Class. He subsequently returned the medal in December 2008 in protest over the release on probation of the former Red Army Faction terrorist Christian Klar, who had been involved in the kidnap and murder of Hanns Martin Schleyer in 1977.
 Hannelore Piegler (33)
 Chief flight attendant. She was in charge of the cabin crew, servicing the first class passengers. Subsequently she published a book on the hijacking entitled 'A Hundred Hours Between Fear and Hope'.
 Anna-Maria Staringer (28)
 Flight attendant. She had her 28th birthday on the flight. Akache ordered a birthday cake and champagne via the radio in Dubai. The airport catering supplied a cake with 28 candles embellished with "Happy Birthday Anna-Maria".
 Gabriele Dillmann (23)
 Flight attendant. She was dubbed "the angel of Mogadishu" (Engel von Mogadischu) by the German press. Like Schumann and Vietor she was awarded the German Federal Cross of Merit. She subsequently married Lufthansa pilot Rüdeger von Lutzau, who piloted the Lufthansa Boeing 707 aircraft with the GSG9 anti-terrorist squad that landed in Mogadishu. As Gabriele von Lutzau she has acquired an international reputation as a sculptor (principally of figures in beechwood), and has exhibited in numerous exhibitions in Germany and throughout Europe.

Key West German rescue personnel 
 Colonel Ulrich Wegener (48)
 Federal Border Protection (Bundesgrenzschutz) officer who had served as liaison officer with the West German Interior Ministry at the time of the Munich massacre by the PLO during the 1972 Olympic Games. He was subsequently appointed by the West German government to establish and lead an elite anti-terrorist squad. The unit was officially established on 17 April 1973 as a part of West Germany's federal border guard service and named GSG 9, which stands for Grenzschutzgruppe 9 (Border Protection Group 9), as the Bundesgrenzschutz already had eight regular border guard groups. Wegener was trained by both the British SAS and the Israeli Sayeret Matkal, which were the only known established anti-terrorist units in the world at the time. He also participated in the rescue of Israeli hostages in Operation Entebbe in 1976. Wegener planned and commanded the successful GSG 9 operation, code-named Fire Magic, to rescue the Landshut hostages at Mogadishu. After his retirement from GSG 9, Wegener worked as a consultant to help establish counter-terrorism units in various foreign countries. Wegener was a member of the KÖTTER GmbH & Co. KG Verwaltungsdienstleistungen Security Committee. He died on 28 December 2017.
 Major Klaus Blatte (38)
 Deputy Commander of GSG 9 in 1977 and one of the four assault squad leaders that stormed the Landshut at Mogadishu. When Wegener retired, Blatte succeeded him as commander of GSG 9.
 Minister Hans-Jürgen Wischnewski (55)
 Minister of State at the Federal Chancellery who was designated by Chancellor Helmut Schmidt as his special envoy to coordinate the political negotiations with the various foreign governments to facilitate the release or rescue of the Landshut hostages. Due to his excellent contacts and personal relationships with Arab leaders, he was nicknamed "Ben Wisch" by the German press. He lost his position after the CDU regained power in 1982, becoming a travelling consultant to Arab, African, and South American countries, advising them on negotiating techniques and pacification policies to deal with terrorist and insurgent groups. He died in 2005.
 Chancellor Helmut Schmidt (59)
 German Federal Chancellor (Bundeskanzler ) between 1974 and 1982 who adopted a tough, uncompromising stance on the Hanns Martin Schleyer kidnapping and Lufthansa 181 hijacking in 1977. He authorised the GSG 9 mission to rescue the Landshut hostages and his anti-terrorist policies were successful in overcoming the long-standing threat posed by the Red Army Faction. After retiring from the Bundestag in 1986, he helped found the committee supporting the EMU and creation of the European Central Bank. He died in 2015.

Hijacking 
At 11:00 on Thursday 13 October 1977, Lufthansa flight LH 181, a Boeing 737 named Landshut, took off from Palma de Mallorca en route to Frankfurt with 86 passengers and five crew, piloted by Captain Jürgen Schumann, with co-pilot Jürgen Vietor at the controls. About 30 minutes later, as it was overflying Marseille, the aircraft was hijacked by four militants calling themselves "Commando Martyr Halima" in honour of fellow militant Brigitte Kuhlmann, who had been killed in Operation Entebbe the previous year. The leader of the hijacker group was Palestinian terrorist Zohair Youssif Akache (23, male), who adopted the alias "Captain Martyr Mahmud". The other three were Suhaila Sayeh (24, female), a Palestinian, and two Lebanese people, Wabil Harb (23, male) and Hind Alameh (22, female). Akache ("Mahmud") angrily burst into the cockpit, brandishing a fully loaded pistol in his hand. He forcibly removed Vietor from the cockpit, sending him to the economy class area to join the passengers and flight attendants, leaving Schumann to take over the flight controls. As the other three hijackers knocked over food trays, ordering the hostages to put their hands up, Mahmud coerced Captain Schumann to fly east to Larnaca in Cyprus, but was told that the plane had insufficient fuel and would have to land in Rome first.

Rome 
The hijacked aircraft changed course at around 14:30 (as noticed by air traffic controllers at Aix-en-Provence), diverting eastward and landed at Fiumicino Airport in Fiumicino, Rome at 15:45 for refuelling. The hijackers made their first demands, acting in concert with a Red Army Faction group, the Siegfried Hausner Commando, which had kidnapped West German industrialist Hanns Martin Schleyer five weeks earlier: they demanded the release of ten Red Army Faction (RAF) terrorists detained at the JVA Stuttgart-Stammheim prison, plus two Palestinian compatriots held in Turkey, as well as US$15 million. West German Interior Minister Werner Maihofer contacted his Italian counterpart Francesco Cossiga and suggested the plane's tyres be shot out to prevent the aircraft from taking off. After consulting with his colleagues, Cossiga decided that the most desirable solution for the Italian government was to rid itself of the problem altogether. The aircraft was refuelled with a full 11 tons of fuel, allowing Mahmud to order co-pilot Vietor (who had been allowed to re-enter the cockpit on the ground at Fiumicino at Schumann's behest) to take off and fly the plane to Larnaca at 17:45 (5:45 p.m.) without even obtaining clearance from Rome air traffic control.

Larnaca 
The Landshut landed in Larnaca, Cyprus, at 20:28. After about an hour, a local PLO representative arrived at the airport and over the radio tried to persuade Mahmud to release the hostages. This only provoked a furious response from Mahmud, who started angrily screaming at him in Arabic until the PLO representative gave up and left. The aircraft was then refuelled and Schumann asked flight control for a routing to Beirut. He was told that Beirut Airport was blockaded and closed to them and Mahmud suggested that they would fly to Damascus instead. The Landshut took off at 22:50, heading for Beirut, but was refused permission to land there at 23:01. After also being denied landing permission in Damascus at 23:14, Baghdad at 00:13 (14 October), and Kuwait at 00:58, they flew to Bahrain.

Bahrain 
Schumann was told by a passing Qantas airliner that Bahrain Airport was also closed to them. Schumann radioed flight control and told them that they had insufficient fuel to fly elsewhere and despite being told again that the airport was closed, he was suddenly given an automatic landing frequency by the flight controller. The plane finally touched down in Bahrain at 01:52 on 14 October. On arrival, the aircraft was immediately surrounded by armed troops and Mahmud radioed the tower that unless the soldiers were withdrawn, he would shoot the co-pilot. After a stand-off with the tower, with Mahmud setting a five‑minute deadline and holding a loaded pistol to Vietor's head, the troops were withdrawn. The aircraft was then refuelled and took off for Dubai at 03:24.

Dubai 
Approaching Dubai, the 737 was again denied landing permission. Overflying the Dubai airport in the early light of dawn, the hijackers and pilots saw the runway blocked with military jeeps, trucks and fire engines. Running short of fuel, Schumann radioed the tower to announce that they were going to land anyway. As they made a low pass over the airport, the vehicles were finally being removed. At 05:40 local time, the pilots made a smooth touchdown on the airport's main runway at sunrise. The plane was parked at the parking bay around 05:51, at daybreak.

In Dubai, the terrorists instructed the control tower to send airport crew staffers to empty the toilet tanks, supply food, water, medicine, newspapers, and take away the rubbish. Captain Schumann was able to communicate the number of hijackers on board, specifying that there were two male and two female hijackers by dropping different types of cigarettes on the tarmac from out of the cockpit window. In an interview with journalists, this information was revealed by Dubai's Sheikh Mohammed, then Minister of Defence. The hijackers learned about this, possibly from the radio, causing an enraged Mahmud to angrily threaten Schumann's life for secretly sharing this coded message. The aircraft remained parked on the tarmac stationed at Dubai airport all throughout Saturday 15 October, during which the jetliner experienced technical snags with the electrical generator, air conditioning and auxiliary power unit breaking down. The hijackers demanded that engineers fix the plane. On the morning of Sunday 16 October, Mahmud threatened to start shooting hostages if the aircraft was not refuelled, and Dubai authorities eventually agreed to refuel the plane.

In the meantime, both Hans-Jürgen Wischnewski, the West German minister responsible for handling the hijacking, and Colonel Ulrich Wegener, commander of elite German anti-terrorist squad GSG 9, had arrived in Dubai to try to persuade the government to agree to let GSG 9 commandos into Dubai to storm the aircraft. However, after permission was granted for GSG 9 commandos to storm the aircraft, SAS and GSG 9 senior operatives insisted on additional combat exercises and dry-runs on an adjacent airstrip. Reports suggest up to 45 hours of training was conducted while in Dubai (over a period of 80 hours). While Wegener was contemplating his options, the jetliner was on the move again after the hijackers fully refuelled the Landshut plane and the pilots started up the engines. At 12:19 on Sunday 16 October it took off, bound for Salalah and Masirah in Oman, where permission to land was once again denied and both airports were blockaded. After Riyadh also closed and blockaded its airport runways at 14:50 on 16 October (three days after the hijacking began), a course was set to Aden in South Yemen, at the limit of the plane's fuel range.

Aden 
Approaching and overflying Aden, the flight was yet again denied permission to land, this time at Aden International Airport, and both main runways (including the apron) were blocked by military jeeps, tanks and other vehicles. The plane was running dangerously low on fuel, but the Aden airport authorities adamantly refused to clear the runways, leaving co-pilot Vietor little choice but to make an emergency landing on an unpaved sand strip roughly parallel to (in-between) both runways. The plane remained largely intact following the ground roll but when the Aden authorities told the hijackers and pilots that they needed to fly away, both pilots were concerned about the aircraft's airworthiness after its rough, hard landing on rugged, rocky and sandy terrain, deeming it unsafe to take off and fly the jetliner again until a thorough engineering inspection had been made. After the engineers claimed that everything was all right with the airframe, Mahmud consequently allowed Schumann to check the condition of the landing gear and the engines. Both engines had ingested a copious amount of sand and dirt at maximum reverse thrust and were clogged up. The landing gear had not collapsed, but its structure was weakened and its extension/retraction mechanism was damaged. Schumann did not immediately return to the plane after inspecting it, even after numerous calls by the hijackers threatening to detonate the aircraft because of his departure. The reasons for his prolonged absence remain unclear to this day. Some news reports, including interviews with Yemeni airport authorities, imply that Schumann was asking ground crews to prevent the flight from taking off and to refuse to accede to the terrorists' demands.

Schumann subsequently boarded the plane to face the wrath of Mahmud, who furiously forced him to kneel on the passenger cabin floor before fatally shooting him in the head, without giving him a chance to explain himself. The hijacked plane was refuelled at 01:00 on 17 October and at 02:02, flown by co-pilot Vietor, it dangerously and sluggishly took off from Aden on course for the Somali capital of Mogadishu.

Mogadishu 
On the morning of 17 October at daybreak, around 06:34 local time, the Landshut made an unannounced and textbook landing on the main runway at Aden Adde airport in Mogadishu. The Somali government had initially refused the plane permission to land, but relented when the jet appeared in Somali air space, for fear of endangering the passengers’ lives by turning the aircraft away. The chief hijacker leader Mahmud (Akache) told co-pilot Vietor that he was very impressed by Vietor's impressive flying skills and that consequently he was free to disembark and flee, since the crippled plane was in no state to fly elsewhere. Vietor, however, opted to remain with the 82 passengers and three other crew members on board. After the twin‐engine aircraft was parked in front of the main airport terminal, it was surrounded at a distance by armed Somali troops. Schumann's corpse (which had been stored in a coat closet on board the flight throughout the final leg of the journey) was dumped via the aircraft's right rear emergency evacuation slide onto the tarmac, and whisked away in an ambulance. During the day, the hijackers asked for food and drugs, which were sent after the Somali government gave its permission; a Somali request that the hijackers release the women and children in exchange for the supplies was rejected. The hijackers set a 16:00 deadline for the Red Army Faction prisoners to be released, at which time they threatened to blow up the aircraft. The hijackers poured the duty-free spirits over the hostages in preparation for the destruction of the aircraft, which did not eventuate, the hijackers were told that the West German government had agreed to release the RAF prisoners but that their transfer to Mogadishu would take several more hours. The hijackers agreed to extend the deadline to 02:30 the following morning (18 October).

Operation Feuerzauber 

Meanwhile, while West German Chancellor Helmut Schmidt attempted to negotiate an agreement with Somali President Siad Barre, special envoy Hans-Jürgen Wischnewski and GSG 9 commander Ulrich Wegener arrived at Mogadishu airport from Jeddah in a Lufthansa 707 aircraft co-piloted by Rüdiger von Lutzau (Gabriele Dillmann's fiancé). In West Germany, a team of 30 GSG 9 commandos under deputy commander Major Klaus Blatte had assembled at Hangelar airfield near Bonn, awaiting instructions. The commandos took off from Cologne-Bonn Airport on a Boeing 707 on Monday morning (17 October) en route to Djibouti, within a short flying time of Somalia, while Schmidt negotiated with the Somalis. While the team was flying over Ethiopia, an agreement was reached and permission given to land at Mogadishu. The aircraft landed at 20:00 local time with all its lights out to avoid detection by the hijackers.

After four hours, unloading all of their equipment and undertaking the necessary reconnaissance, Wegener and Blatte finalised the assault plan, scheduled to begin at 02:00 local time. They decided to approach from the rear of the aircraft, its blind spot, in six teams using black-painted aluminium ladders to gain access to the aircraft through the escape hatches on the bottom of the fuselage and via the overwing doors. In the meantime, a fictitious progress report on the journey being taken by the released prisoners was being fed to Mahmud by German representatives in the airport tower. Just after 02:00, Mahmud was told that the plane carrying the prisoners had just departed from Cairo after refuelling and he was asked to provide the conditions of the prisoner/hostage exchange over the radio.

As a small force, the GSG-9 relied on their Somali counterparts to maintain ground defence around the aircraft as well as deception operations. Several minutes before the rescue, Somali soldiers lit a fire  in front of the jet as a diversionary tactic, prompting Akache and two of the other three hijackers to rush to the cockpit to observe what was going on, isolating them from the hostages in the cabin. At 02:07 local time, the GSG 9 commandos silently climbed up their ladders and opened the emergency doors. Wegener, at the head of one group, opened the forward door, and two other groups, led by Sergeant-Major Dieter Fox and Sergeant Joachim Huemmer, stormed the aircraft using ladders to climb up onto the wings and open both overwing emergency doors at the same time. Shouting in German for the passengers and crew to get on the floor, the commandos shot all four terrorists, killing Wabil Harb and Hind Alameh and wounding Zohair Akache and Suhaila Sayeh. Akache died of his injuries hours later. One GSG 9 commando was wounded by return fire from the terrorists. Three passengers and a flight attendant were slightly wounded in the crossfire. An American passenger aboard the plane described the rescue: "I saw the door open and a man appears. His face was painted black and he starts shouting in German 'We're here to rescue you, get down!' [Wir sind hier, um euch zu retten, runter!] and they started shooting."

The emergency escape chutes were deployed, and passengers and crew were ordered to quickly evacuate the aircraft. At 02:12 local time, just five minutes after the assault had commenced, the commandos radioed: "Frühlingszeit! Frühlingszeit!" ("Springtime! Springtime!"), which was the code word for the successful completion of the operation. A few moments later, a radio signal was sent to Chancellor Schmidt in Bonn: "Four opponents down – hostages free – four hostages slightly wounded – one commando slightly wounded".

The rescuers escorted all 86 passengers to safety, and a few hours later they were all flown to Cologne-Bonn Airport, landing in the early afternoon of Tuesday 18 October and given a hero's welcome.

Aftermath 
News of the rescue of the hostages was followed by the deaths (and alleged suicides) of RAF (Red Army Faction) members Andreas Baader, Gudrun Ensslin and Jan-Carl Raspe at JVA Stuttgart-Stammheim Prison. RAF member Irmgard Möller also attempted suicide but survived her injuries. On Wednesday 19 October, the body of Hanns-Martin Schleyer, who had been kidnapped by the RAF some five weeks prior to the hijacking, was found in the trunk of a car on a side street in Mulhouse; the RAF had shot him dead upon hearing about the deaths of their imprisoned comrades. They contacted French newspaper Libération to announce his 'execution'; a subsequent post-mortem examination indicated that he had been killed the previous day.

After the Landshut crisis, the German government stated it would never again negotiate with terrorists (as it previously had with Lufthansa Flight 649 and 615 hijackers). Chancellor Helmut Schmidt was widely praised among western countries for his decision to storm the aircraft to rescue the hostages, although some criticized the risky action.

West German-Somali relations received a significant boost after the successful operation. Lufthansa henceforth serviced all Somali Airlines planes in West Germany, while Frankfurt became Somali Airlines' new gateway to Europe. The West German government, as a sign of gratitude, issued two multi-million dollar loans to the Somali government to assist in the development of the country's fisheries, agriculture and other sectors.

The aircraft 

Originally built in January 1970, the Landshut is a Boeing 737-230C (manufacturer's serial number 20254, Boeing line number 230, registration ) with two Pratt & Whitney JT8D-9A engines, named after the city of Landshut in Bavaria. While under control of the hijackers, the plane had traveled . The damaged aircraft was ferried back to Germany, repaired, and returned to service in late November 1977. It continued to fly for Lufthansa until September 1985, and was sold three months later to US carrier Presidential Airways. It subsequently changed hands several times.

Purchase 
The plane ultimately ended up in the fleet of Brazilian carrier TAF Linhas Aéreas, which purchased it for US$4,708,268 from Transmille Air Services of Kuala Lumpur. The Brazilian company subsequently went bankrupt and was unable to continue paying off the debt. TAF stopped service of the aircraft under registration PT-MTB in January 2008, owing to severe damage that made it unairworthy, and placed it in storage in Fortaleza Airport for years. On 14 August 2017, after Mr Kurpjuweit made inquiries to Fraport about scrapping seven or more abandoned aircraft at the airport, an ex-pilot group suggested bringing the plane back to Germany. David Dornier, former director of the Dornier Museum, along with the German Foreign Ministry, subsequently agreed to the project. Informed of the plans, Kurpjuweit helped the museum director with a feasibility project involving transport of the aircraft in a Volga-Dnepr Airlines An-124. The 737 was acquired from TAF for R$75,936 (€20,519) in an agreement with the Fortaleza Airport administration for payment of taxes. On 15 August 2017, a MD-11F (registration D-ALCC) was sent to the airport with 8.5 tonnes of equipment and 15 Lufthansa Technik mechanics to dismantle the B737. On 21 and 22 September 2017, an An-124 and Il-76, also from Volga-Dnepr Airlines, arrived at Fortaleza. The An-124 carried the wings and fuselage back to Europe, while the Il-76 carried the engines and seats. After a refuelling stop in Cape Verde, both arrived in Friedrichshafen on 23 September 2017, for a total cost of €10 million paid by the Foreign Ministry. Smaller parts and equipment were sent to Germany in two cargo ship containers. Upon arrival, the parts were presented to approximately 4,000 people during a special event. The recovered Landshut aircraft was scheduled to be restored and exhibited by October 2019.

Storage 
The disassembled plane has since been stored in a hangar at Airplus maintenance GmbH in Friedrichshafen. The plan to restore and display it in its original 1977 Lufthansa livery was never carried out. Funding issues and questions over competing responsibilities between ministries delayed the project, as did uncertainty over €300,000 in yearly costs. In February 2020, a proposal to transfer the plane parts to Berlin Tempelhof was rejected by the Ministry. After three years in a hangar and with the 737's fate unresolved, David Dornier stepped down in September 2020 as museum director and was replaced by attorney Hans-Peter Rien. He and Culture Minister Monika Grütters (CDU) never agreed on further financing, and the project was placed on hold.

Studies 
The federal government looked into whether the aircraft could be exhibited in the Air Force Museum in Berlin-Gatow. The plans did not meet with approval from historians and experts, due to its remote location and lack of connection between the German army and the “Landshut” aircraft. CSU members of the Munich city council proposed bringing the aircraft to Munich, and an application was filed to see if the plane could be exhibited at former Munich Riem Airport. The city highlighted to Culture Minister Grütters the aircraft's connection to Munich, where it had been christened on 7 August 1970 in a Riem Airport hangar in the presence of a large delegation from Landshut. After exactly three years, plans to exhibit the 737 in Dornier Museum were effectively over.

Museum 
€15 million was made available from the German federal government, in the following allotments:
€7.5 million:
€2.5 million: aircraft maintenance and restoration
€2.5 million: hangar construction
€1.5 million: provision of technical equipment
€1.0 million: implementation of teaching concept
€7.5 million: operating subsidy for the 10-year period, tied to the requirement to limit museum entrance fees to 5 euros per person

Location 
The money is linked to the Friedrichshafen location, but not to others. However the Culture Ministry had objections and postponed a final decision, to Headquarters of the Federal Police Directorate in Sankt Augustin-Hangelar in North Rhine-Westphalia with the headquarters of the GSG9 special force. A Web Portal about the case was made https://www.landshutmuseum.com/

Decisions 
1- The Aircraft will not be restored.
2- It will not have a museum just for it, but parts could be displayed spread in several locations.
3- Aircraft is possible to be mostly recycled.

Use of the name Landshut in other airplanes 
The name Landshut has been used by Lufthansa on three other planes since 1985:
 Boeing 737-200 D-ABHM (1985-1996)
 Airbus A319-100 D-AILK (1997-2001)
 Airbus A330-300 D-AIKE (2007-2021)

Notable hostages 
 Horst-Gregorio Canellas, German football official responsible for breaking the 1971 Bundesliga scandal was one of the hostages on board, along with his daughter.

In popular culture 
The song "122 Hours of Fear" by The Screamers, recorded in 1978, was inspired by the hijacking.

The song "RAF" by Brian Eno and Snatch (Judy Nylon and Patti Palladin) was created using sound elements from a Baader Meinhof ransom message available by public telephone at the time of the hijacking.

The hijacking and the hostage rescue operation were portrayed in two German television films:  in 1997 and Mogadischu, directed by Roland Suso Richter, in 2008.

The hijacking and rescue were also portrayed in the Black Ops television series, season 2 episode 76, titled "Operation Fire Magic".

The 2015 video game Tom Clancy's Rainbow Six Siege used Lufthansa Flight 181, along with other historical hostage extraction operations, as inspiration for the game and as research for making the game more accurate.

The hijacking and rescue were also a subplot device in the 2018 film Suspiria.

See also 
 Operation Entebbe
 List of hostage crises

References

Further reading
McNab, Chris. Storming Flight 181 – GSG 9 and the Mogadishu Hijack 1977 Osprey Raid Series No. 19; Osprey Publishing, 2011. .
Davies, Barry. Fire Magic – Hijack at Mogadishu Bloomsbury Publishing, 1994. .
Blumenau, Bernhard. The United Nations and Terrorism. Germany, Multilateralism, and Antiterrorism Efforts in the 1970s Palgrave Macmillan, 2014, ch. 2. .

External links 

 Mogadischu at the Internet Movie Database
 Documentary about the GSG9 
 

Accidents and incidents involving the Boeing 737 Original
Airborne operations
Aircraft hijackings
Attacks on aircraft by Palestinian militant groups
Aviation accidents and incidents in Somalia
Aviation accidents and incidents in 1977
Deaths by firearm in Somalia
Deaths by firearm in Yemen
GSG 9
Hostage taking
181 
Operations involving German special forces
Palestinian terrorist incidents in Europe
Popular Front for the Liberation of Palestine attacks
Red Army Faction
Terrorist incidents in Europe in 1977
1977 crimes in Germany
1977 in Germany
1977 in Somalia
20th century in Mogadishu
October 1977 events in Africa
Terrorist incidents in Africa in 1977
Terrorist incidents in Somalia in the 1970s
1970s murders in Somalia
1977 murders in Africa
1970s crimes in Somalia
1977 disasters in Somalia
Aviation accidents and incidents in the Mediterranean Sea